On!Air!Library! was an American post-rock/ambient/experimental rock band from New York City. Twin sisters Claudia and Alejandra Deheza formed the group with Phillip Wann in 1998. Through playing at local venues and parties, the trio eventually landed a deal with Arena Rock Recording Co. in 2002, and in 2003, a split record with The Album Leaf exposed the band to a wider audience, paving the way for their full-length, self-titled, debut album in 2004. That same year, they embarked on a nationwide tour with Interpol and The Secret Machines. In 2005, On! Air! Library! disbanded. The Deheza sisters both became involved in a new project, School of Seven Bells, with former Secret Machines guitarist Benjamin Curtis. Wann also started a new band, Daylight's for the Birds, which released its first album in 2006.

Discography

Albums
On!Air!Library! (EP) (2001)
A Lifetime or More split EP with The Album Leaf (2003)
On!Air!Library! (2004)

Other releases
 "Bambalance" on The Manchurian Candidate film soundtrack (2004)
"Snow Miser" on The Night Before: A New York Christmas

References

External links
Official website
[ On!Air!Library! on AllMusic]
Arena Rock Recording Co.

American post-rock groups
Arena Rock Recording Company artists
Indie rock musical groups from New York (state)
Musical groups established in 1998
Musical groups disestablished in 2005
Musical groups from New York City
1998 establishments in New York City
2005 disestablishments in New York (state)